Joseph Eve may refer to:
Joseph Eve (politician) (1784–1843), American politician and diplomat
Joseph Eve, Certified Public Accountants, an American public accounting firm

See also
Eve Joseph (born 1953), Canadian poet and author